NGC 4531 is a spiral galaxy located about 50 million light-years away in the constellation Virgo. It was discovered by astronomer William Herschel on April 17, 1784. NGC 4531 is a member of the Virgo Cluster.

See also
 List of NGC objects (4001–5000)
 NGC 4826

References

External links

Virgo (constellation)
Spiral galaxies
4531
41806
7729
Astronomical objects discovered in 1784
Virgo Cluster
Discoveries by William Herschel